Hedi Mattoussi is a Tunisian-American materials scientist and Professor at Florida State University. His research considers colloidal inorganic nanocrystals for biological imaging and sensing. He is a Fellow of the American Physical Society, American Chemical Society and Materials Research Society.

Early life and education 
Mattoussi studied physics at the University of Tunis El Manar, which he completed with honours in 1982. He completed his doctoral research at the Université Pierre-et-Marie-Curie, where he studied mesomorphic polymers in solution. On completing his PhD, Mattoussi was made a research associate at the Collège de France. He moved to the United States in 1987, first joining University of Massachusetts Amherst, then Carnegie Mellon University.

Research and career 
In 1992 Mattoussi joined the University of Florida, where he worked as an assistant scientist in the Department of Physics. Mattoussi joined the United States Naval Research Laboratory in 1997, where he served as Principal Investigator. There he developed inorganic nanoparticles and studied how they interact with biological systems.

Mattoussi joined the faculty at Florida State University as a Professor of Chemistry, where he leads a group that study the interfaces between inorganic nanocrystals and biological systems. To this end, he designs and synthesises novel nanocrystals based on semiconductors and metallic nanoparticles, creates multifunctional ligands and studies nanoparticle-bioconjugates. He has used quantum dot fluorophore to study the Förster resonance energy transfer process.

Mattoussi serves on the Advisory Board of Physical Chemistry Chemical Physics.

Awards and honours 
 2008 Top Navy Engineer of the Year
 2011 Elected Fellow of the American Chemical Society
 2014 Elected Fellow of the American Physical Society
 2020 Elected Fellow of the Materials Research Society

Selected publications

References 

Living people
Year of birth missing (living people)
American people of Tunisian descent
Pierre and Marie Curie University alumni
Florida State University faculty
Fellows of the American Physical Society
Fellows of the American Chemical Society
American materials scientists